The Farm is an oil painting made by Joan Miró between the summer of 1921 in Mont-roig del Camp and winter 1922 in Paris. It is a kind of inventory of the masia (traditional Catalan farmhouse) owned by his family since 1911 in the town of Mont-roig del Camp. Miró himself regarded this work as a key in his career, describing it as "a summary of my entire life in the countryside" and "the summary of one period of my work, but also the point of departure for what was to follow." It is preserved in the National Gallery of Art in Washington DC, where it was given in 1987 by Mary Hemingway, coming from the private collection of American writer Ernest Hemingway, who had described it by saying, “It has in it all that you feel about Spain when you are there and all that you feel when you are away and cannot go there. No one else has been able to paint these two very opposing things.”

History

The painter, though born in Barcelona, was always linked with the rural world, especially the town of Mont-roig del Camp, and his early works show an influence of the landscapes and characters in their summer country views in the land of Tarragona. This relationship with the land can be captured in the paintings produced between 1918 and 1924 as Vegetable Garden with Donkey(1918) or Montroig, the church and the people(1919). The Farm was started on Miró's first trip back to Mont-roig del Camp from France, and was completed in Paris. It was a time when Miró was established in Paris and alternated with some travels, especially summers in Mont-Roig.

The observation of everything around him and the lights on the rocks and trees, that changed in certain times the brightness of the sun, made the artist feel bound to the element earth, which was said:

By economic necessity, he began a tour with art dealers to sell this artwork. Léonce Rosenberg, among others who took care of the paintings of Picasso, agreed to have it in storage and any time and at the insistence of Miró, he seriously suggested dividing the canvas into small pieces to make it easier to sell. Miró, angry, picked up the canvas and took it to his workshop. Then, Jacques Viot, of the Pierre gallery, who after a few treatments, sold it to the writer Ernest Hemingway, for five thousand french francs. Hemingway wrote in 1934 in the journal Cahiers d'art, "I won't change The Farm for any painting in the world"

Miró later would use the area of Mont-Roig in other works such as Earth and worker or Catalan Landscape (The Hunter). In them, as in The Farm, can be observed succession in the transformation of figurative forms to other places, where there are all kinds of symbol and graphics.

History for Miró 
Miró was the first reporter on the story of his artwork:

The building of the house belonging to the Miró family, Mas Miró, was declared a Cultural Asset of National Interest in 2006. After years of paperwork between the family and various public institutions, they did an agreement to make the project an active museum, where the painter's personal items will be displayed in addition to the recreation of their most important works, including The Farm through prints that show the quality and texture of the oil paintings. According to statements made by the grandson of the artist Emilio Fernandez Miró, "In addition both the Barcelona Joan Miró Foundation and the family yield original works. The house is full of graffitis, which my grandfather used as drafts for his works [...] We want it to be a living museum. We will be providing it with works in rotation."

Description 

The Farm is the culminating work of the "retailer" time of Joan Miró, made when he was 29 years old, and James J. Sweeney considered as "key work of the artist's later development." He worked on it for nine months of tough preparation. The mythical relationship with the land held by Miró is summarized in this table, the graphic nature of naive and unrealistic of all objects: the animals are domestic, plants are the ones that the man works and objects are all of daily use and necessary for the home. Learn all the details to a minimum, is called the "Miró handwriting" starting point for the following years of his contact with surrealism.

The painting denotes all the familiarity that was represented with Miró. It is made in a place where you can see the daily activities of a farmhouse and the characteristics of the building objects and animals. The clear definition of the drawings can easily achieves the recognition of all without causing any confusion. Like a stock shows a mule, some chickens, a dog, a goat, a rabbit, snails, insects and lizards, most isolated and most of them placed on any object that ago as a display on pedestals, the possibility of union between the object and animal piece by Braque "says justification" and get moving among the other elements of the work depicted. The building of the house includes the crevices and cracks in the plastered wall. In the center of the painting is a large eucalyptus born of a black circle, which contrasts with the white circle representing the Sun from the sky. All elements of this painting, animals and objects came to be in the form of prototypes symbol that would appear in several works by Miró, for example one of the most common is the ladder representing evasion.

Calling the work "Miró's climactic masterpiece," American critic Arthur Danto wrote,
"The Farm is energized by two incompatible artistic realities, corresponding to the polarities of Miró's life. It has the obsessive documentation of visual reality that we find in primitive painting: each leaf on the dominating eucalyptus tree is separately painted, each rock in the stony field to the right is given an autonomous space, each blade of grass is given its own identity. . . The barking dog, the rabbit, the snail, the cock, the donkey, the dove, the pail, the watering can, the wagon, the plow, the dozens of farm implements, the farmer's wife, the baby by the wash trough, are each suspended in the shadowless clarity of a metaphysical illumination — it is the kind of light one gets through an optical instrument. . . It is as though the artist had intermixed, in a single work, the illusory space of traditional landscape with the shallow space of Cubism, so that everything is on the surface and at the same time bears no relation to the surface, which, after all, is not part of the landscape...No one who knows great painting can look at it without sensing the divided consciousness and the aesthetic indeterminacy of an artist who sank into his art the oppositions of his vision: Catalan and Parisian, traditionalist and Cubist, naif and cosmopolite."

Analysis 
Several historians and art critics have given their opinion on this reference work:

Ernest Hemingway and The Farm
The American writer Ernest Hemingway bought Miró's painting as a birthday present for his wife, Hadley; after paying off the last installment of the 5,000 francs it cost, he brought The Farm home: "In the open taxi the wind caught the big canvas as though it were a sail, and we made the taxi driver crawl along." Hemingway later said, "No one could look at it and not know it had been painted by a great painter."

Exhibits

References

Further reading

External links 
The Farm at the National Gallery of Art in Washington

1922 paintings
Paintings by Joan Miró
Animals in art
Collections of the National Gallery of Art
Farming in art
Sun in art